Ring of Fire is the English translation of L'anello di fuoco, the 2006 Italian fantasy novel for young people written by Pierdomenico Baccalario, with illustrations by Lacopo Bruno. Ring of Fire is Book One of the Century Quartet.

The English translation by Leah D. Janeczko was published in New York by Random House, in 2009. It is held in 597 WorldCat libraries. The novel has been also been translated into French, German and Dutch. 

Book Two, Star of Stone, set in New York City, was published in English in 2010. Book Three, City of Wind, set in Paris, was released in September 2011. The last installment, Dragon of Seas, is set in Shanghai, China. It was released in September 2012.

Summary
At a hotel in Rome, four children, Harvey from New York, Mistral from Paris, Sheng from Shanghai, and Elettra, the hotel owner's daughter, come together, apparently by chance, and realize that they were all born on the same day. They meet a man who gives them a suitcase. The next day the man is killed by powerful enemies who will do anything to get their hands on this treasure. They are destined to become involved in a mystery involving a briefcase and five tops which contains clues leading to ancient mystical artifacts, a mystery that will bring them all into peril. A race to find the ancient mystical artifacts first and to avoid death. If they find this artifact what will happen?Will they die?

See also
Pierdomenico Baccalario (Italian)

References

2006 novels
Italian fantasy novels
Young adult fantasy novels
Novels set in Rome
Novels set in hotels